Gymnoascoideus is a genus of fungi within the Gymnoascaceae family.

References

External links
Gymnoascoideus at Index Fungorum

Eurotiomycetes genera
Onygenales